Trindade do Sul is a municipality in the state of Rio Grande do Sul, Brazil.

Geography 
The municipality of Trindade do Sul is a part of the Microregion of Frederico Westphalen. It is located at a latitude of 27º31'13" south and a longitude of 52º53'00" west, being at an altitude of 640 meters above sea level.

This municipality is divided in several localities, called lines. Those are:
 Barra Grande
 Barra Seca
 Barrinha
 Baú
 Bonita
 Cachoeira
 Campina de Pedras
 Passo do Lobo
 Caturrita
 Colônia Nova
 Demétrio
 Filisbina
 Gastão
 Girau
 São Paulo
 São Vicente
 Fátima
 Rincão dos Rosas
 Rossetto
 Assentamento 29 de Outubro

Population 
According to IBGE statistics from 2020, Trindade do Sul has a population of 5,791 people.

See also
List of municipalities in Rio Grande do Sul
Largest cities in Rio Grande do Sul by population

References

Municipalities in Rio Grande do Sul